Gornja Slatina refers to:

In Bosnia and Herzegovina:
 Gornja Slatina (Ribnik) a village in Ribnik municipality
 Gornja Slatina (Šamac) a village in Šamac municipality

In Serbia:

 Gornja Slatina (Leskovac), a village in Leskovac municipality